Arani Municipality is the first municipal section of the Arani Province in the Cochabamba Department, Bolivia. Its seat is Arani. At the time of census 2001 the municipality had 11,542 inhabitants.  

It is bordered to the north by the Tiraque Province, to the east by the Vacas Municipality, to the south by the Mizque Province and to the west by the Punata Province.

Subdivision 
The municipality consists of the following three cantons:

Population 
The people are predominantly indigenous citizens of Quechua descent.

Festivities 
Every year on August 24 the population of Arani celebrates one of its most important Catholic festivities, Virgen La Bella, dedicated to the Virgin Mary, whose image is venerated with much devotion by the residents and people from abroad.

See also 
 K'illi K'illi

References

External links 
 Arani Municipality: Population data and map

Municipalities of the Cochabamba Department